Hear What I Say is the fifth and final studio album by the Dutch born 1980's pop singer C. C. Catch, released in 1989 in Germany and worldwide, produced by member of Duran Duran and The Power Station Andy Taylor. It contains two singles: Big Time (#26 hit in Germany) and Midnight Hour. "Hear What I Say" was the first album, that wasn't produced by Dieter Bohlen. Notable that album has a lot of influences, including house, funk and especially new jack swing which was in mainstream at that time.

Charts

Track listing 
Midnight Hour (Cyndi Valentine, Tony Green) – 4:35
Big Time (C. C. Catch, Georg Koppehele, Martin Koppehele) – 3:51
Love Away (C. C. Catch, Dave Clayton, Jo Dworniak) – 4:12
Give Me What I Want (C. C. Catch, Dave Clayton, Jo Dworniak) – 3:47
I'm Gonna Miss You (Mennana Szimanneck, Peter Szimanneck) – 5:40
Backgirl (Andreas Van Kane, Nicholas Marriot) – 3:31
Can't Catch Me (C. C. Catch, Dave Clayton, Jo Dworniak) – 3:51
Hear What I Say (C.C. Catch, Dave Clayton, Jo Dworniak) – 3:49
Nothing's Gonna Change Our Love (C. C. Catch, Dave Clayton, Jo Dworniak) – 3:50
Feels Like Heaven (C. C. Catch, Dave Clayton, Jo Dworniak) – 5:20

Credits
Design [Cover Design] – Michael Behr 
Management – Simon Napier-Bell 
Mastered By – Ian Cooper 
Other [Hair] – Keith Harris 
Other [Make-up] – Sara Raeburn 
Other [Stylist] – Peta Hunt 
Photography By [Cover] – Brian Aris 
Producer – Andy Taylor (tracks: 1, 5, 6), Dave Clayton (tracks: 3, 4, 7 to 10), Jo Dworniak (tracks: 3, 4, 7 to 10) 
Written-By – C. C. Catch (tracks: 3, 4, 7 to 10), Dave Clayton (tracks: 3, 4, 7 to 10), Jo Dworniak (tracks: 3, 4, 7 to 10)

Notes
Mastered at Townhouse Studios.

Published by

Polygram Songs [tracks 1 and 2]
Copyright Control / Polygram Songs [tracks 3, 4, 7 to 10]
Warner Chappell [track 5]
Miau Musik/Inferno Musik [track 6]

℗ 1989 Metronome Music GmbH, Hamburg

References 

C. C. Catch albums
1989 albums